Greenside High School is a public co-educational high school in Johannesburg, Gauteng, South Africa.

Greenside High School (Top Public School in Gauteng 2007) is situated in the suburb of Greenside.

Academics

The school also offers an AP English course, which is taught mostly by the school's principal, Ms N. Whyte. An external company offers AP Maths as an additional subject at a cost to the student.

Facilities

Greenside High School increased the size of its swimming pool in 2013/14. The main sport field is used for cricket, rugby, touch rugby, soccer, and athletics. Their hockey fields, which run adjacent to Parkview Golf Club, are mainly used for hockey, but have also been used for cricket, soccer and rugby. Greenside has four basketball courts which also double up as netball courts. There are eight tennis courts.

Extra-curricular activities
Greenside's extra-curricular programmes include:

The school competes in RAPS, FEDA, EADS, and (as of 2017) GRADS. In 2013, students launched a production of Fame.

In 2017, students from the Greenside High School robotics team traveled to Costa Rica to take part in the WRO Global Robotics Tournament. Greenside High School was the only public school from South Africa to represent the country in this tournament.

Notable alumni
 Jani Allan, columnist
 Trenton Birch, singer of Trenton and Free Radical
 Matthew Buckland, Internet entrepreneur
 Alistair Cragg, international track and field athlete
 Candîce Hillebrand, actress and singer-songwriter
 Claire Johnston, lead singer of Mango Groove
 Bonnie Mbuli, television host and actress
 Mmabatho Montsho, actress
 Stephen "Sugar" Segerman from the documentary Searching For Sugar Man
 Lesego Semenya, celebrity chef
 James Small, rugby

See also
List of high schools in South Africa

References

External links
 

Schools in Johannesburg